HDMS Peter Willemoes (F362) is a  in the Royal Danish Navy. The ship is named after Peter Willemoes, a 18-19th-century Danish officer.

Design 

The class is built on the experience gained from the Absalon-class support ships, and by reusing the basic hull design of the Absalon class the Royal Danish Navy have been able to construct the Iver Huitfeldt class considerably cheaper than comparable ships.

The frigates are compatible with the Danish Navy's StanFlex modular mission payload system used in the Absalons, and are designed with slots for six modules. Each of the four stanflex positions on the missile deck is able to accommodate either the Mark 141 8-cell Harpoon launcher module, or the 12-cell Mark 56 ESSM VLS. The Peter Willemoes passed the British Flag Officer Sea Training test in 2015.

While the Absalon-class ships are primarily designed for command and support roles, with a large ro-ro deck, the three new Iver Huitfeldt-class frigates will be equipped for an air defence role with Standard Missiles, and the potential to use Tomahawk cruise missiles, a first for the Danish Navy.

The ships were constructed in blocks in Estonia and Lithuania. These blocks were then towed to the Odense Steel Shipyard where they were assembled.

Construction and career 
She was laid down on 12 March 2009 and launched on 21 December 2010 by Odense Steel Shipyard, Odense. Commissioned on 21 June 2011.

On 18 February 2017, she came alongside USS George H.W. Bush as the aircraft carrier was replenishing with USNS Supply.

Peter Willemoes transits the Gulf of Aden while on patrol on 24 April 2019.

Gallery

See also

References

External links 

2010 ships
Iver Huitfeldt-class frigates
Ships built in Odense